Events from the year 1768 in Russia

Incumbents
 Monarch – Catherine II

Events

  Russo-Turkish War (1768–74)

Births

 

 Vera Zavadovskaya, courtier  (d. 1845)
 Avdotya Vorobyeva

Deaths

References

1768 in Russia
Years of the 18th century in the Russian Empire